Stylish Century was a notable Australian thoroughbred racehorse.

A son of Double Century from the Forex mare Stylish he was foaled in 1986 and was trained by a number of trainers throughout his career including Bart Cummings for a short time.

Known for his bold, front-running style he won quality races like the 1989 AJC Spring Champion Stakes, VRC Victoria Derby and the 1991 AJC Queen Elizabeth Stakes. As a 3-year old he also ran a close second to Almaarad in the 1989 MVRC W.S. Cox Plate.

He ran in the 1990 Japan Cup, won by David Hayes' Better Loosen Up.  
Stylish Century broke through the barrier and bolted prior to the race and was timed at a near world record pace for a 1000m before being vetted and declared fit to run. He ran a great race to lead them up well into the home straight and was by no means the last to cross the finish line.

Retired to stud, he only had moderate success with his best performer being Buster Jones winner of the 1999 VATC Sandown Stakes.

He died in 2003 following a spider bite.

Race record
58 starts - 11 wins, 8 seconds, 7 third

Prizemoney
A$2,510,520

Major wins 
Stylish Century won the following major races:

 1989 AJC Spring Champion Stakes – (2000m)
 1989 VRC Victoria Derby – (2400m)
 1990 VATC Caulfield Autumn Classic – (1800m)
 1991 AJC Queen Elizabeth Stakes – (2000m)
 1991 VATC Sandown Cup – (2400m)

See also
 List of millionaire racehorses in Australia

Thoroughbred family 1-s
1986 racehorse births
2003 racehorse deaths
Victoria Derby winners
Racehorses bred in Australia
Racehorses trained in Australia
Byerley Turk sire line